Jean Manuel Mayen (26 March 1930 – 30 March 2011) was an Algerian racing cyclist. He rode in the 1951 Tour de France.

References

External links
 

1930 births
2011 deaths
Algerian male cyclists
Place of birth missing
21st-century Algerian people